Grič pri Trebnjem is a small settlement west of Trebnje in eastern Slovenia. It lies below the northern slopes of Fat Hill (420 m). The Municipality of Trebnje is part of the historical region of Lower Carniola and is now included in the Southeast Slovenia Statistical Region.

Name
The name of the settlement was changed from Grič to Grič pri Trebnjem in 1955.

References

External links
Grič pri Trebnjem at Geopedia

Populated places in the Municipality of Trebnje